The 2016–2017 international cricket season was from September 2016 to April 2017. During this period, 41 Test matches, 87 One Day Internationals (ODIs), 43 Twenty20 Internationals (T20Is), 4 first class matches, 16 List A matches, 41 Women's One Day Internationals (WODIs), and 15 Women's Twenty20 Internationals (WT20Is) were played. Of the 41 Test matches that took place in this season, 3 were day/night Test matches. The season started with Pakistan leading the Test cricket rankings, Australia leading the ODI rankings, New Zealand leading the Twenty20 rankings, and Australia women leading the Women's rankings.

Men's full member cricket started with New Zealand's tour to India. India's 3–0 win over New Zealand in the Test series saw India move up to first in the Test rankings. This tour also saw several milestones in Indian cricket with the first Test of the series being India's 500th Test match, the second Test of the series being India's 250th Test at home, and the first ODI being India's 900th ODI. Notable highlights in this season include Bangladesh's first ever Test victory over England in a two-match series tied 1–1, and South Africa's third consecutive Test series victory against Australia in Australia. However, South Africa's tour to Australia suffered from controversy as the International Cricket Council (ICC) charged Faf du Plessis, South Africa's captain with ball tampering. New Zealand managed to win its first Test series against Pakistan since 1985. India won the Test series against England, contested for the Anthony de Mello Trophy, for the first time since 2008. The tenth edition of the Chappell–Hadlee Trophy, which was held in Australia, was won by Australia 3–0, and the eleventh edition, which was held in New Zealand, was won by New Zealand 2–0. Bangladesh played its first ever Test match in India, which India won by 208 runs. There was one international tournament, a tri-series in Zimbabwe which also contained Sri Lanka and the West Indies, which was won by Sri Lanka. The season also witnessed Sri Lanka's first ever series win in any format against South Africa in South Africa when they won the T20I series 2–1. South Africa recorded twelve consecutive ODI wins that included a whitewash of Australia and Sri Lanka at home. The final Test series of the season saw Pakistan win their first ever Test series in the West Indies.

In men's associate and affiliate cricket, three matches of the Intercontinental Cup and six matches of the World Cricket League Championship were scheduled to take place. The results of these matches have so far seen Papua New Guinea move into first place in the World Cricket League Championship and fourth in the Intercontinental Cup. Additional international tours and tournaments were also scheduled among the top associates and affiliates: UAE vs Oman, Hong Kong vs Papua New Guinea, Afghanistan vs Ireland, the 2017 Desert T20 Challenge, and the 2016–17 United Arab Emirates Tri-Nation Series. Afghanistan also played a three match series against Bangladesh (losing 2–1), and Ireland played ODIs against South Africa and Australia, losing both. In addition, another step in the 2019 Cricket World Cup qualification process was completed with the United States and Oman being promoted into World Cricket League Division 3.

This season also saw conclusion of the 2014–16 ICC Women's Championship, with the final seven series (matches from rounds 6 and 7) being scheduled in this period. At the conclusion of these matches, Australia, England, New Zealand, and the West Indies were the top four teams of the tournament, and therefore gained direct qualification for the 2017 Women's Cricket World Cup. The bottom four teams (India, South Africa, Pakistan and Sri Lanka) are placed in the 2017 Women's Cricket World Cup Qualifier, along with Bangladesh, Ireland, Zimbabwe, Thailand, Papua New Guinea and Scotland. There was some controversy, however, as the series between India and Pakistan was supposed to be scheduled in this time period, but the series never went ahead. As a result, the ICC Technical Committee ruled that India's Women's team had forfeited all of the matches, with the points being awarded to Pakistan, effectively consigning India to the bottom four. The 2016 Women's Twenty20 Asia Cup was also played during this season, with India winning their sixth consecutive title. The tournament opener, between India and Bangladesh, saw history as Bangladesh was bowled out for 54, which is the lowest total in Women's Twenty20 Internationals. However, this record stood for only four days, as later on in the tournament, Bangladesh were bowled out for 44 by Pakistan.

Season overview

Rankings

The following are the rankings at the beginning of the season:

September

Australia Women in Sri Lanka

New Zealand in India

West Indies vs Pakistan in United Arab Emirates

Afghanistan in Bangladesh

Ireland in South Africa

Australia vs. Ireland in South Africa

Australia in South Africa

October

England in Bangladesh

New Zealand Women in South Africa

England Women in West Indies

Oman in United Arab Emirates

Namibia in Papua New Guinea

Sri Lanka in Zimbabwe

2016 ICC World Cricket League Division Four

Final standings

November

South Africa in Australia

Papua New Guinea in Hong Kong

England in India

Pakistan Women in New Zealand

England Women in Sri Lanka

West Indies Women in India

2016–17 Zimbabwe Tri-Series

Pakistan in New Zealand

Hong Kong in Kenya

South Africa Women in Australia

2016 Women's Twenty20 Asia Cup

December

New Zealand in Australia

Afghanistan in United Arab Emirates

Pakistan in Australia

2016 Under-19 Asia Cup

Bangladesh in New Zealand

Sri Lanka in South Africa

January

South Africa women in Bangladesh

2017 Desert T20 Challenge

2016–17 United Arab Emirates Tri-Nation Series

Australia in New Zealand

February

2017 Women's Cricket World Cup Qualifier

Bangladesh in India

Netherlands in Hong Kong

Afghanistan in Zimbabwe

South Africa in New Zealand

Sri Lanka in Australia

New Zealand women in Australia

Australia in India

Australia women in New Zealand

March

Ireland in United Arab Emirates

England in West Indies

Ireland vs. Afghanistan in India

Kenya in Nepal

Bangladesh in Sri Lanka

Pakistan in West Indies

Papua New Guinea in United Arab Emirates

References

 
2016 in cricket
2017 in cricket